Franziska Albl (born 29 April 1995) is a German ice hockey player for the Wanderers Germering and the German national team.

She participated at the 2015 IIHF Women's World Championship as well as 2017 and 2021.

References

External links

1995 births
Living people
Sportspeople from Füssen
German women's ice hockey goaltenders